Neil Sedaka Sings His Greatest Hits is a 1963 compilation album of twelve of the most popular hits of Neil Sedaka's tenure with RCA Victor.

Track listing

Side One
 "Next Door To An Angel" (1962)
 "Oh! Carol" (1959)
 "King of Clowns" (1962)
 "Stairway to Heaven" (1960)
 "Run Samson Run" (1960)
 "Calendar Girl" (1961)

Side Two
 "Breaking Up Is Hard to Do (1962)
 "The Diary" (1958)
 "Happy Birthday Sweet Sixteen" (1961)
 "Little Devil" (1961)
 "Sweet Little You" (1961)
 "You Mean Everything to Me" (1960)

Re-release
The album was re-released in 1975 and again in 1992.

Each release used different cover art. The original 1963 issue featured a painting of a teenage girl admiring a photo of Sedaka on her nightstand. The 1975 second edition featured a 1970s-era photo of Sedaka in a tuxedo standing against a black background. The 1992 third edition, the first CD issue of this album, shown above, features a standard early-1960s publicity photo of Sedaka.

Foreign Release

In Italy, the album was released with the Italian title, "Neil Sedaka Canta I Suoi Successi".

In Spain, the album was released in 1973 under the title, "Oh! Carol" on the RCA International label.

References

1963 greatest hits albums
Neil Sedaka compilation albums
RCA Victor compilation albums